Owchghaz, also rendered as Owjghaz or Jigas or Ujqaz or Uchqaz or Yujqaz or Owjiqaz or Ujeghaz or Owjqaz, may refer to:
 Owchghaz-e Olya
 Owchghaz-e Sofla